Gregory Efthimios Louganis (born January 29, 1960) is an American Olympic diver, LGBT activist, and author who won gold medals at the 1984 and 1988 Summer Olympics on the springboard and platform. He is the only man and the second diver in Olympic history to sweep the diving events in consecutive Olympic Games. He has been called both "the greatest American diver" and "probably the greatest diver in history".

Early life and education
Louganis was born in El Cajon, California, and is of Samoan and  His teenage biological parents placed him for adoption when he was eight months old and he was raised in California by his adoptive parents, Frances and Peter Louganis. His adoptive father was of Greek descent. Louganis reconnected with his biological father, Fouvale Lutu, in 1984. Through the help of DNA tests and his half-siblings, he found his biological mother in 2017.

He started taking dance, acrobatics and gymnastics classes at 18 months, after witnessing his sister's classes and attempting to join in. By the age of three, he was practicing daily and was competing and giving public performances. For the next few years, he regularly competed and performed at various places including nursing homes and the local naval base. As a child, he was diagnosed with asthma and allergies, so to help with the conditions, he was encouraged to continue the dance and gymnastics classes. He also took up trampolining, and at the age of nine began diving lessons after the family got a swimming pool. He attended Santa Ana High School in Santa Ana, Valhalla High School in El Cajon, and Mission Viejo High School in Mission Viejo.

In 1978, he subsequently attended the University of Miami, where he majored in drama and continued diving. In 1981, he transferred to the University of California, Irvine, where he graduated with a major in theater and a minor in dance in 1983.

Diving career
As a Junior Olympic competitor, Louganis caught the eye of Dr. Sammy Lee, two-time Olympic champion, who began coaching him. At sixteen, Louganis took part in the 1976 Summer Olympics in Montreal, where he placed second in the tower event, behind Italian sport legend Klaus Dibiasi. Two years later, with Dibiasi retired, Louganis won his first world title in the same event with the help of coach Ron O'Brien.

Louganis was a favorite for two golds in the 1980 Summer Olympics in Moscow, but an American boycott of the games prevented him from participating. He was one of 461 athletes to receive a Congressional Gold Medal years later. Louganis won two titles at the world championships in 1982, where he became the first diver in a major international meeting to get a perfect score of 10 from all seven judges. At the 1984 Los Angeles Olympics, with record scores and leads over his opponents, Louganis won gold medals in both the springboard and tower diving events.

He won two more world championship titles in 1986.

At the 1988 Seoul Olympics, he struck his head on the springboard during the preliminary rounds, leading to a concussion. He completed the preliminaries despite his injury. He then earned the highest single score of the qualifying round for his next dive and repeated the dive during the finals, earning the gold medal by a margin of 25 points. In the 10 m finals, he won the gold medal, performing a 3.4 difficulty dive in his last attempt, earning 86.70 points for a total of 638.61, surpassing silver medalist Xiong Ni by only 1.14 points. His comeback earned him the title of ABC's Wide World of Sports "Athlete of the Year" for 1988.

HIV status and head injury
Six months before the 1988 Seoul Olympics, Louganis was diagnosed with HIV, and started antiretrovirals. After Louganis came out publicly as HIV-positive in 1995, people in and out of the international diving community began to question Louganis's decision not to disclose his HIV status at the time of his head injury during the 1988 Olympics, given that he had bled into a pool that others then dove into. Louganis has stated that, during the ordeal, he was "paralyzed with fear" that he would infect another competitor, or the doctor who treated him. Ultimately, no one else was infected. The incident posed no risk to others as any blood was fully diluted by the pool water, and according to John Ward, chief of HIV-AIDS surveillance at the U.S. Centers for Disease Control and Prevention, "chlorine kills HIV". Since skin is an effective barrier to HIV, the only way the virus could enter would be through an open wound; "If the virus just touches the skin, it is unheard of for it to cause infection: the skin has no receptors to bind HIV," explained the National Institute of Allergy and Infectious Diseases' Dr. Anthony Fauci at the time.

Endorsement deals
Louganis got few endorsement deals following his 1984 and 1988 Olympic victories, his one major deal being Speedo, a partnership which lasted until 2007. Some of his fellow athletes blamed homophobia for his lack of deals, since he had been rumored to be gay even before he came out. Louganis has stated that he suspects that his sexuality played a part, although he feels that in part he was simply overshadowed in the public imagination by other American Olympians, most notably Mary Lou Retton.

In 2016, Louganis was pictured on boxes of Wheaties cereal, where prominent American athletes are famously featured, as part of a special "Legends" series that also included 1980s Olympians Janet Evans and Edwin Moses. This occurred approximately a year after a change.org petition was launched that requested that he be featured, although General Mills denied any influence from the petition.

Coaching
In November 2010, Louganis began coaching divers of a wide range of ages and abilities in the SoCal Divers Club in Fullerton, California.

He was a mentor to the US diving team at the London 2012 Olympics and the Rio de Janeiro 2016 Olympics.

Media career

Acting
Louganis had been a theater major in college, and in the late 1980s and 1990s, he appeared in a number of movies, including Touch Me in 1997.

In 1993, he played the role of Darius in an Off-Broadway production of the play Jeffrey. In 1995, he starred for six weeks in the Off-Broadway production of Dan Butler's one man-show about gay life, The Only Thing Worse You Could Have Told Me, taking over from Butler himself. In the play he portrayed 14 different characters.

In 2008, he appeared in the film Watercolors, in the role of Coach Brown, a swimming instructor in a high school.

In 2012, he appeared in the ninth episode of the second season of IFC's comedy series Portlandia, playing himself.

Television
In September 2000, Louganis appeared on Hollywood Squares as a member of famous Olympic gold medalists "Dream Team," competing in a special week of the game show series broadcast as a tribute to the 2000 Summer Games. The episodes marked the first time that all these champions came together for this kind of television competition.

In 2013, Louganis was Dive Master in the celebrity diving show Splash on ABC, and a diving judge on Celebrity Splash! on Channel 7 in Australia.

In 2020, he was a diving judge on the second season of the ABC show Holey Moley.

Books and video diary
In 1996, Louganis recounted his story in a bestselling autobiography, Breaking the Surface, co-written with Eric Marcus. In the book, Louganis detailed a relationship of domestic abuse and rape as well as teenage depression, and how he began smoking and drinking at a young age. The book spent five weeks at number one on The New York Times Best Seller list.

In 1998, Louganis released a video diary called Looking to the Light, which picked up where Breaking the Surface left off.

In 1999, Louganis co-wrote the book For the Life of Your Dog: A Complete Guide to Having a Dog From Adoption and Birth Through Sickness and Health with Betty Sicora Siino.

Dog agility competitions
After retiring from diving, Louganis began to compete in dog agility competitions; he has said that being around the dogs gave him "a sense of security, company and unconditional love". His dogs have included Dr. Schivago; Captain Woof Blitzer; Nipper and son, Dobby, both champion Jack Russell terriers; Gryff (Gryffindor), a border collie; and Hedwig, a Hungarian Puli. Nipper was named for the RCA dog, while Gryff, Dobby and Hedwig were named for Harry Potter characters, as Louganis is a self-described "huge Harry Potter fan."

Activism

Louganis is a gay rights activist, as well as an HIV awareness advocate. He has worked frequently with the Human Rights Campaign to defend the civil liberties of the LGBT community and people diagnosed with HIV/AIDS.

In the October/November 2010 issue of ABILITY Magazine, Louganis stated that the "Don't Ask, Don't Tell" policy was "absurd," "unconstitutional," and a "witch-hunt." He added that "gay men and women have been serving this country for years ... [it's] basically encouraging people who are serving our country to lie to each other."

Louganis is on the board of directors to the USA-based chapter of the charitable foundation of Princess Charlene of Monaco.

In 2023, it was reported that Louganis is auctioning three of his five Olympic medals in an effort to fund the Damien Center, Indiana's oldest and largest AIDS services center. "The medals, they're in the history books," he said. "Instead of holding on to them, I'm aiming to share my piece of Olympic history with collectors; together, we can help the Damien Center and its community to grow and thrive."

Personal life

From 1983 to 1989, Louganis was in a romantic relationship with his manager, R. James "Jim" Babbitt. Louganis has described the relationship as abusive, saying that at one point in 1983, Babbitt raped him at knifepoint. Louganis also accused Babbitt of taking 80% of his earnings.

Six months before the 1988 Olympics, Louganis was diagnosed with HIV; he had contracted the virus from Babbitt. His doctor placed him on the antiretroviral drug AZT, which he took every four hours round-the-clock.

In 1989, Louganis obtained a restraining order against Babbitt. Babbitt died of AIDS in 1990.

For his 33rd birthday in 1993, Louganis held a "final birthday party" for family and friends, as a way to say goodbye; he was in failing health and thought he would die of AIDS soon.

Louganis publicly came out as gay in a pre-taped announcement shown at the opening ceremony of the 1994 Gay Games, having been persuaded to do so by Gay Games organizers. Even before then, he led what has been described as "an openly gay life".

In 1995 he announced that he was HIV-positive, around the time of the release of his memoir, Breaking the Surface. In a 1995 interview with Barbara Walters, Louganis spoke publicly for the first time about being gay and HIV-positive.

In June 2013 Louganis announced his engagement to his partner, paralegal Johnny Chaillot, in People magazine. The two were married on October 12, 2013.  On June 18, 2021, Louganis announced on Instagram that he and Chaillot were ending their marriage.

In popular culture
Louganis's 1984 and 1988 Olympic victories were covered in Bud Greenspan's documentaries about the 1984 and 1988 Summer Olympics, both titled 16 Days of Glory.

Louganis's memoir Breaking the Surface was adapted as the 1997 USA Network TV movie Breaking the Surface: The Greg Louganis Story with Mario Lopez playing the lead and Louganis narrating.

In the first episode of the TV series Jackass, Johnny Knoxville calls himself "Greg Pooganis" as he puts on swimming gear to prepare for his Poo Cocktail stunt.

In the third episode of season 3 of the TV series Lois & Clark: The New Adventures of Superman, after Lois Lane, while in a trance, jumps out of a helicopter, Jimmy Olsen says to her "Lois you looked like Greg Louganis, whooshed right out the door."

In the 2005 film The Longest Yard, the character Caretaker responds to the argument that Crewe is a "natural athlete", saying, "So is Greg Louganis, but I bet you he'd get his ass whupped out here."

Actor Michael Fassbender took Louganis's gait and mannerisms as inspiration for his portrayal of an advanced humanoid robot in the 2012 film Prometheus, stating that "Louganis was my first inspiration. I figured that I'd sort of base my physicality roughly around him, and then it kind of went from there."

In the first episode of season 3 of the TV series Castle, the medical examiner describes a victim who had fallen from a window as having done "a Greg Louganis out that window up there".

Louganis was the subject of the documentary Back on Board which aired on HBO on August 4, 2015.

He was the subject of a short documentary, Thicker than Water, which appeared on the ESPN.com website as part of their 30 for 30 Shorts series on December 1, 2015. The documentary covered Louganis's ordeal, and ultimate triumph, at the 1988 Olympics.

Awards and honors

 In 1984, Louganis received the James E. Sullivan Award from the Amateur Athletic Union (AAU) as the most outstanding amateur athlete in the United States.
 In 1988, he was awarded "Athlete of the Year" by ABC's Wide World of Sports.
 In 1989, he was nominated for "Best Male Athlete" by the Kids' Choice Awards.
 In 1991, Greg was inducted into the University of Miami Sports Hall of Fame.
 In June 2013, Louganis was inducted into the California Sports Hall of Fame. He was among the first class of inductees into the National Gay and Lesbian Sports Hall of Fame on August 2, 2013.
 In April 2015, Louganis was presented the Bonham Centre Award from The Mark S. Bonham Centre for Sexual Diversity Studies, University of Toronto, for his contributions to the advancement and education of issues around sexual identification.
 In July 2015, he was a torch bearer for the 2015 Special Olympics World Summer Games in Los Angeles.
 In January 2017, he was a Grand Marshal of the Rose Parade in Pasadena, California.

Bibliography 
 1996 – Breaking the Surface
 1999 – For the Life of Your Dog

Filmography
 Dirty Laundry (1987) as Larry
 Inside Out III (1992) as Max in the segment "The Wet Dream"
 D2: The Mighty Ducks (1994) as himself 
 It's My Party (1996) as Dan Zuma
 Breaking the Surface: The Greg Louganis Story (1997)
 Touch Me (1997) as David
 Sports Theater with Shaquille O'Neal (episode: "Broken Record") (1997 TV movie) as Coach Hill
 Watercolors (2008) as Coach Brown
 30 for 30: "Tim Richmond: To the Limit" (2010)
 Portlandia, season 2, episode 9 (2012) as himself
 Splash (2013) as himself
 Celebrity Splash! (2013) as himself
 Back on Board: Greg Louganis (2014)
 Sabre Dance (2015) as Salvador Dalí
 Entourage (2015) as a fictional version of himself
 30 for 30: Thicker than Water (2015)

See also

 World Fit

References

External links
  
 
 
 
 
 
 
 https://www.facebook.com/greglouganisondwts?bookmark_t=page

1960 births
American adoptees
American autobiographers
American information and reference writers
American people of Swedish descent
American sportspeople of Samoan descent
American people of Greek descent
Divers at the 1976 Summer Olympics
Divers at the 1984 Summer Olympics
Divers at the 1988 Summer Olympics
James E. Sullivan Award recipients
Living people
Olympic gold medalists for the United States in diving
Olympic silver medalists for the United States in diving
University of California, Irvine alumni
University of Miami alumni
Gay memoirists
American LGBT sportspeople
People with HIV/AIDS
Gay sportsmen
LGBT divers
Sportspeople from El Cajon, California
American male divers
Participants in American reality television series
American LGBT rights activists
American gay writers
American philanthropists
LGBT people from California
Medalists at the 1976 Summer Olympics
Medalists at the 1984 Summer Olympics
Medalists at the 1988 Summer Olympics
World Aquatics Championships medalists in diving
Pan American Games gold medalists for the United States
Activists from California
Pan American Games medalists in diving
Universiade medalists in diving
Divers at the 1979 Pan American Games
Divers at the 1983 Pan American Games
Divers at the 1987 Pan American Games
Congressional Gold Medal recipients
Universiade gold medalists for the United States
Playgirl Men of the Month
Medalists at the 1983 Summer Universiade
Medalists at the 1979 Pan American Games
Medalists at the 1983 Pan American Games
Medalists at the 1987 Pan American Games